Lotte Horne (born 3 June 1943) is a Danish film actress. She appeared in 15 films between 1966 and 1973.

Filmography
Seks roller søger en forfatter (1973)
Indbildt hanrej (1971)
Nattens frelse (1971)
Threesome (1970)
Sangen om den røde rubin (1970)
Mig og min lillebror og Bølle (1969)
Sjov i gaden (1969)
Midt i en jazztid (1969)
Mig og min lillebror og storsmuglerne (1968)
Jeg elsker blåt (1968)
Mig og min lillebror (1967)
Människor möts och ljuv musik uppstår i hjärtat (1967)
Smukke-Arne og Rosa (1967)
Jeg - en marki (1967)
Der var engang (1966)

References

External links

1943 births
Living people
Danish film actresses